Jörg Müller (born 3 September 1969) is a Dutch-born German BMW factory driver.

Racing career
Born in Kerkrade, Netherlands, Müller won the titles in 1989 German Formula Opel Lotus Challenge and in 1989 European Formula Ford 1600.

The 1994, German Formula Three Champion won a Supertouring car race for BMW in 1995 and the 1995-1996 Spa 24 Hours as well as the 1996 Formula 3000 Championship for team RSM Helmut Marko Lola-Zytek. He also won the prestigious Macau Grand Prix in 1993.

From 1997 to 1998, Müller was a Formula One testdriver for Arrows and Sauber-Petronas, before joining the BMW-WilliamsF1 project to do tests for engines and Michelin tyres from 1999 to 2001. He never managed to race in Formula One though, and was the first F3000 champion since the series' inception to fail to make the step up.

From 1997 to 2000 he was also busy in sportscar racing, with drives for Nissan (and Porsche in the FIA GT Championship, 1998). He was part of the team that was winning the 24 Hours of Daytona in a Porsche 911 GT1 and leading the 1999 24 Hours of Le Mans for 18 hours in a BMW V12 LMR.

In 2000 (BMW V12 LMR) and 2001 (BMW M3 GTR V8), Müller was successful in the American Le Mans Series (ALMS) for BMW and Schnitzer Motorsport, having won the 2001 ALMS GT title.

From the 2002 to 2005 season, Müller drove BMW 3 Series (E46) touring cars for the Schnitzer-operated works squad BMW Team Deutschland (also called BMW Team Germany) in the FIA European Touring Car Championship (now WTCC), and used BMW 3 Series (E90) touring cars in seasons after 2005. From 2002, he and Dirk Müller participated in the ETCC and WTCC until the latter left for the ALMS after 2006.

The 2004 24 Hours Nürburgring was won by both Müllers (and Hans-Joachim Stuck) with the BMW M3 GTR V8 that had been raced successfully in the 2001 ALMS. In 2005, the Müllers finished 2nd behind their sister car.

In 2006 Müller finished second in the World Touring Car Championship (WTCC). The following year, in Dirk Müller's absence, Augusto Farfus - joining fresh from Alfa Romeo - became Müller's new teammate for the 2007-09 seasons. Müller finished seventh in the 2007 championship, seventh again in 2008, and sixth in 2009.

For 2010 BMW reduced its WTCC squad down to two cars. Müller left the WTCC and became part of BMW's Le Mans Series team. This move brought immediate success in the form of an overall win for Müller at the 24 Hours Nürburgring in an M3 GT2. This victory was shared with Augusto Farfus, Pedro Lamy, and Uwe Alzen. In November Müller teamed up with Dirk Werner at the Intercontinental Le Mans Cup and the pair won the 1000km of Zhuhai for BMW Team Schnitzer.

During the 2011 ILMC season, Müller repeated his victory in Zhuhai, finishing 1st in class in the 6 Hours of Zhuhai. He shared this victory with Augusto Farfus.
Also, in the same year, Müller participated in that year's Nürburgring 24 Hour Race as defending champion in the BMW M3 GT, with exactly the same lineup from 2010 entered by BMW Team Schnitzer with (Farfus, Alzen, Lamy). The team placed 2nd at the end of the race.

With BMW's factory effort entirely on the DTM for the 2012 programme, and their indefinite suspension of Le Mans efforts, Müller returned to the American Le Mans Series sharing a BMW with Bill Auberlen. He claimed a win and three podiums, plus two 4th-place finishes, and finished 6th overall.

For 2013, Müller joined Schubert Motorsport for a season in the ADAC GT Masters. He finished 17th overall, claiming a podium at Nürburgring, and given an accident he had at Spa-Francorchamps. Because of this accident, however, he was unable to attend that year's running of the Nürburgring 24 Hours. Claudia Hürtgen took his place. Müller also made a guest appearance at that year's Suzuka 1000 km, helping GSR & Studie to a 2nd-place finish, but was later disqualified during the post-race inspection.
That year, it was revealed BMW Motorsport had not retained Müller with a factory contract; but as he was unable to find a new employer, BMW subsequently provided the veteran with a new contract. This ensured Müller would continue his career as a works driver.

In 2014, Müller joined BMW Sports Trophy Team Studie for a full season of the Super GT Championship, racing a BMW Z4 GT3. While Müller and teammate Seiji Ara were unable to pull off a single victory in the season, despite several close battles for P1 on some occasions, their efforts were enough to land them in 3rd place in the overall standings. Augusto Farfus helped Müller and Ara secure a podium at the 1000 km race in Suzuka. Müller also made appearances with BMW Sports Trophy Team Marc VDS at the Nürburgring 24 Hour Race and the Spa 24 Hours.

Müller's 2015 season started shortly at the turn of the year, driving for the MPB Racing Team's BMW M235i Racing in the Dubai 24 Hour as a BMW works driver. However, a braking problem with the car resulting in a repair lasting at least two hours cost the team any chance of a class victory. Nevertheless, the MPB Racing Team's BMW still set the fastest lap in class. In addition to his outings with BMW Sports Trophy Team Studie, he joined BMW Sports Trophy Team Marc VDS again for another running at the 24 Hours Nürburgring. However, a pit fire with his car cost the team 7 minutes, and by the end of the race Müller finished in an impressive 4th place (the sister car finished 2nd), with fellow works drivers Augusto Farfus, Nicky Catsburg, and Dirk Adorf.
On February 5, 2015, Müller was given the honour of driving the BMW M6 GT3 on first roll-out at the BMW factory in Dingolfing, in addition to providing crucial support in the development stage of the car. The BMW M6 GT3 being the successor to the Z4 GT3.

In 2016, Müller continued participating in what would be his third season in the Super GT Championship, alongside BMW Team Studie (renamed from BMW Sports Trophy Team Studie). As usual, he appeared at the 24 Hours Nürburgring; rejoining Schubert Motorsport in a BMW M6 GT3. On May 14, Müller, alongside DTM champion Marco Wittmann and BMW Motorsport Junior Jesse Krohn, recorded the BMW M6 GT3's first ever win, finishing first overall in a VLN 4-hour race. During the 24-hour race with Wittmann, Krohn, and Augusto Farfus, Müller was leading the field until his M6 GT3 suffered from a broken powertrain. The car was subsequently sent to the Schubert garage for extensive repairs lasting over twelve hours and by the end of the race finished 120th overall.
For the remainder of the 2016 season, in addition to Super GT, Müller continued to participate in the VLN. There, he - with Jesse Krohn and Victor Bouveng - recorded three podium finishes (two 3rd place finishes, one 2nd place) and a 5th place finish in a Walkenhorst Motorsport M6 GT3, and a 2nd place finish in a BMW Team RBM-operated M6 GT3 in the last race.

The start of the 2017 season saw Müller join Schubert Motorsport again for an outing at the Dubai 24 Hour in a still-developing BMW M4 GT4. For BMW Motorsport's purposes, the race was treated as a test and development session for the new car with Müller, fellow works driver Jens Klingmann, and BMW Motorsport Junior Ricky Collard at the wheel. The result was a flawless race for the team with the BMW M4 GT4 finishing 25th place overall (5th in the SPX class) having started from 49th on the grid. The following month saw Müller join BMW Motorsport Juniors Ricky Collard, Nico Menzel, and Joel Eriksson as a mentor in a BMW M6 GT3 with Walkenhorst Motorsport for the Bathurst 12 Hour, but unfortunately was unable to participate in the race itself as the car crashed during qualifying. The month after, it was announced Müller would rejoin BMW Team Studie again for a fourth season in the Super GT Championship. At the 24 Hours Nürburgring, he was responsible for driving both of the Schubert-entered M6 GT3 and finished 11th and 12th overall. As well, he continued participating in the VLN picking up a win for Falken Motorsports in an M6 GT3.

Family
Müller is the son of former European Karting-champion Ewald Müller. He is not related to former team-mate Dirk Müller or to French driver Yvan Muller.

Müller currently resides in Monaco. He has a younger brother, Rainer, and an older sister, Marion.

Racing record

Complete International Formula 3000 results
(key) (Races in bold indicate pole position; races in italics indicate fastest lap.)

Complete American Le Mans Series results

Complete European Touring Car Championship results
(key) (Races in bold indicate pole position) (Races in italics indicate fastest lap)

† — Did not finish the race, but was classified as he completed over 90% of the race distance.

Complete World Touring Car Championship results
(key) (Races in bold indicate pole position) (Races in italics indicate fastest lap)

† — Did not finish the race, but was classified as he completed over 90% of the race distance.

Complete Super GT results
(key) (Races in bold indicate pole position) (Races in italics indicate fastest lap)

24 Hours of Le Mans results

External links

Jörg Müller official website 
Profile - by FIA GT Championship official website

1969 births
Living people
24 Hours of Le Mans drivers
American Le Mans Series drivers
FIA GT Championship drivers
German racing drivers
German Formula Three Championship drivers
International Formula 3000 Champions
International Formula 3000 drivers
European Le Mans Series drivers
World Touring Car Championship drivers
ADAC GT Masters drivers
Super GT drivers
24 Hours of Spa drivers
European Touring Car Championship drivers
Blancpain Endurance Series drivers
Sportspeople from Kerkrade
Asian Le Mans Series drivers
12 Hours of Sebring drivers
24H Series drivers
BMW M drivers
RSM Marko drivers
Rahal Letterman Lanigan Racing drivers
Schnitzer Motorsport drivers
Porsche Motorsports drivers
Nismo drivers
Team Joest drivers
Nürburgring 24 Hours drivers